Canton of Cholet-1 is a canton of France, located in the Maine-et-Loire department, in the Pays de la Loire region. Since the French canton reorganisation which came into effect in March 2015, the canton contains the southwestern part of the commune of Cholet.

See also
 Arrondissement of Cholet
 Cantons of the Maine-et-Loire department
 Communes of the Maine-et-Loire department

References

External links
  Canton of Cholet 1 on the website of the General Council of Maine-et-Loire

Cholet 1
Cholet